Álvaro Mesén Murillo (born December 24, 1972) is a retired Costa Rican footballer.

Club career
Upon club legend Alejandro González Rojas's retirement in September 1990, then-sixteen years old Álvaro Mesén was called upon to the Alajuelense senior team to backfill the third-choice goalkeeper position, behind the more experienced pair of Desiderio Calvo and Paul Mayorga; however upon the signing of former Herediano goalkeeper José Alexis Rojas in early 1991, Mesén was sent back to the youth teams. Rojas's signing had the purpose of adding experience to Alajuelense's door, which was lacking upon González's retirement as Mayorga and Calvo only started a handful of games in the past two seasons, and neither one of them could keep the other's faults in check.

Mesén made his league debut for Carmelita on 6 March 1993 against Turrialba during the 1992-93 season before heading back to parent club Alajuelense ahead of the 1993-94 season.

Mesén eventually became an understudy to Rojas who was the first-choice goalkeeper, and rose to first-choice keeper himself ahead of the 1997-98 season, when Rojas's career ended at Alajuelense as a result of being on the receiving end of an eight-match ban (as he was involved in a post-match brawl after a match against Saprissa in June 1997--Mesén also was involved in said brawl but received a minor ban), causing the Alajuelense's Board of Directors to show him the door as Rojas was going to be unavailable for six matches (having served two on the 1996-97 season's finals).

He went on to play 207 league games for Liga, scoring one goal, a penalty in the 1999-2000 season.

He also played for Herediano and Brujas before finishing his career at Liberia Mía, after joining them in 2007.

International career
Mesén made his debut for Costa Rica in a November 1999 friendly match against Slovakia and earned a total of 38 caps, scoring no goals. He represented his country in 15 FIFA World Cup qualification matches and was a non-playing squad member at the 2002 and 2006 FIFA World Cups.

He also played at the 2003 UNCAF Nations Cup as well as at the 2002, 2003 and 2005 CONCACAF Gold Cups. He also was a non-playing squad member at the 2000 CONCACAF Gold Cup.

His final international was a May 2006 friendly match against the Czech Republic.

He has also become known for his activism, having been appointed as a FIFA ambassador in 2001 and supporting the 2002 FIFA World Cup Global March Against Child Labour campaign.

Retirement
After retiring in 2010, Mesén became the new secretary-general of Fedefutbol in September 2012. He has a master's degree in business administration. He resigned from Fedefutbol in February 2013.

References

External links
 
 2002 World Cup Profile - Nación 

1972 births
Living people
People from Alajuela
Association football goalkeepers
Costa Rican footballers
Costa Rica international footballers
2002 CONCACAF Gold Cup players
2002 FIFA World Cup players
2003 UNCAF Nations Cup players
2003 CONCACAF Gold Cup players
2005 CONCACAF Gold Cup players
2006 FIFA World Cup players
A.D. Carmelita footballers
Liga FPD players
L.D. Alajuelense footballers
C.S. Herediano footballers
Brujas FC players
Municipal Liberia footballers
Copa Centroamericana-winning players